Zaman Khan (born 10 September 2001) is a Pakistani cricketer. In September 2021, he was named in Northern's squad for the 2021–22 National T20 Cup. He made his Twenty20 debut on 23 September 2021, for Northern in the 2021–22 National T20 Cup. In December 2022 He was signed by Jaffna Kings for Lanka Premier League season 03.

Because of his side-arm bowling action he’s regularly compared to former Sri Lankan fast bowler Malinga.

Personal life
Born into a Suleimankhel Pashtun family in  Chakswari, Mirpur District, Azad Kashmir, his father was against his wishes to play cricket, enrolling him into a madrasa after school, with Khan continuing to learn the Qur’an by heart today, but, through the encouragements of his uncle, he later joined different cricket clubs in Mirpur and through his performances and bowling speed he was noticed and got a chance to participate in the Kashmir Premier League in 2021, which would be the breakthrough for his career.

After the victory of Lahore Qalandars in PSL 7 and defeating Multan Sultans in the final, there was a tour held by Lahore Qalandars to visit and celebrate different areas and homes of players. After visiting Zaman Khan's house, the captain of Lahore Qalandars, Shaheen Afridi, requested the COO of Lahore Qalandars to build a house for him, as Zaman Khan lived in a small mud house with a broken roof.

Domestic career
Zaman was first spotted in a Multan Sultans camp back in 2018 before playing for Pakistan Under-17.

Zaman then played for Rawalakot Hawks in the Kashmir Premier League during 2021, during which he gained public recognition. 

Zaman was named in Lahore Qalandar's squad in December 2021 for the seventh edition of the Pakistan Super League.  His bowling with a low economy rate helped Lahore win nerve ending matches.  His bowling efforts helped Lahore Qalandars to win their first ever title in six years. He was given the 'Emerging Player of the Season' award, and took 18 wickets.

International career
In March 2023, he was named in Pakistan's Twenty20 International (T20I) squad for the series against Afghanistan.

References

External links
 

2001 births
Living people
Azad Kashmiri people
People from Mirpur District
Pakistani cricketers
Lahore Qalandars cricketers
Jaffna Kings cricketers